WABJ (1490 AM, "NewsTalk 1490") is a commercial AM radio station broadcasting a talk radio format. Licensed to Adrian, Michigan, it is owned by Bud Walters, with the license held by Southeast Michigan Media, Inc.  The radio studios and offices are on West Maumee Avenue in Adrian, shared with sister station 95.3 WQTE "Q-95 Country."

WABJ is powered at 1,000 watts non-directional.  The transmitter is on East Siena Heights Drive in Adrian, near Race Track Road and the Lenawee County Fairgrounds.

History
In January 1948, the Federal Communications Commission approved the sale of WABJ by Adrian Broadcasting Company to James Gerity Jr.

WABJ has functioned as a full-service station for Adrian and Lenawee County since its founding.  Music, adult contemporary or Middle of the Road (MOR), was phased out in the early 1990s in favor of the station's current talk format.

WABJ is noted as a "springboard station" for some of the most well-known names in broadcasting. It has launched the careers of such notables as Phil Donahue, Jerry Keil, Rich Hoffer, Gary Fullhart, Mickey Morgret, Aimee Faycosh, Pyke, Andy Stuart, Fred LeFebvre and Joe Elardo.

On July 21, 2021, it was announced the station's broadcast signal would be suspended effective August 1, 2021, largely due to insufficient financial sustainability.  WABJ 1490 was heard back on the air on 12/30/2022.

References

Sources 
Michiguide.com - WABJ History

External links

ABJ
Radio stations established in 1946
Adrian, Michigan
1946 establishments in Michigan